The 1984 U.S. Figure Skating Championships took place in Salt Lake City, Utah. Medals were awarded in three colors: gold (first), silver (second), and bronze (third) in four disciplines – men's singles, ladies' singles, pair skating, and ice dancing – across three levels: senior, junior, and novice.

The event determined the U.S. teams for the 1984 Winter Olympics and 1984 World Championships.

Senior results

Men

Ladies

Pairs

Ice dancing

Junior results

Men

Ladies

Pairs

Ice dancing

Novice results

Men

Ladies

Pairs

Ice dancing

References

External links
 http://sportsillustrated.cnn.com/vault/article/magazine/MAG1121677/index.htm
1984 UNITED STATES FIGURE SKATING CHAMPIONSHIPS

U.S. Figure Skating Championships
United States Figure Skating Championships, 1984
United States Figure Skating Championships, 1984
January 1984 sports events in the United States
U.S. Figure Skating